Semi- is a numerical prefix meaning "half". The prefix alone is often used as an abbreviation when the rest of the word (the thing which half of is being described) is clear from context. 

Semi or SEMI may refer to:

 Semiconductor Equipment and Materials International (SEMI)
 Semiconductor industry, also known as semi or semis in financial news
 Semi-automatic firearm
 Semi-detached house, a type of housing
 Semi-erection, a partial erection when the penis is enlarged but not fully erect
 Semi-final, of a knockout competition
 Semi-formal, (esp. high school) dance
 Semi Ojeleye (born 1994), American basketball player
 Semiquaver, the time interval in music, which is half the length of a quaver
 Semi-submersible, a watercraft which operates mostly submerged
 Semi-trailer truck (UK: articulated lorry), a truck design of a tractor vehicle pulling semi-trailers
 Semi-trailer, a trailer with wheels at the rear end only
 Tractor unit (semi truck engine), the motortruck engine drive unit vehicle that pulls the trailers
 Tesla Semi, vehicle by Tesla, Inc. ; an electric vehicle based tractor unit that pulls trailers
 Road train, an extreme version of the semi truck train of trailers
 Goo Semi, member of South Korean girlgroup Cignature

See also

 
 Demi (disambiguation)
 Hemi (disambiguation)
 Half (disambiguation)